Crasville may refer to the four communes in the region of Normandy in France:

Crasville, Eure
Crasville, Manche
Crasville-la-Mallet, in the Seine-Maritime département 
Crasville-la-Rocquefort, in the Seine-Maritime département